The 168 Film Project is a Christian film festival.

The contest starts with the random assignment of verses based on a theme from the scriptures.  Writing and preproduction is the next phase, followed by exactly one week (168 hours) to shoot and edit a finished film.  If the film is on time and at or under the required total run time, then it is eligible for awards. Worldwide, over 750 short films have been produced for the competition from 2003 to 2012.

History 
Founded by John David Ware in 2003, the 168 Film Project started with 13 entries. Winning entries:

2022  
168 is back with the full, worldwide competition and an in-person 168 Film Festival (Nov. 4-5). 
Entry Deadline: August 5. Speed Production Week Aug. 19-26. 
Theme: "Restoration." Governed by storms, the world is driven and tossed by the wind, but the Kingdom of God brings healing and restoration! Take this journey with us, as we explore God’s restoration of our lives today!

2021 
The best overall film of the 168 Film Festival was Gary Centrone and Danica-Rae Miles’ "Crown of Flowers." Centrone won for Best Director. "Crown" took bests for International and Write of Passage categories and "Crown's" Tony Fiora won Best Cinematography. 168 conducted the full competition with a virtual festival.

2020 
Due to the ongoing lockdowns, no competition or festival was held.

2019 
Best Speed Film winner: "True Reflection" by Aaron Kamp.  Best Alumni Film: "So Much More" by Stephanie  Hylton Wang, and best Write of Passage Spotlight Film: "Sunday School" by Alicia Schudt-Schechter and Yvette Sams. Theme: "Rebirth"

2018 
168 Film Festival Overall Best Film Award and Grand Prize (a trip to Cannes Film Festival and a $10,000 Panavision credit) went to "Fhedi," by Producer Maged Hannah and Writer/Director Anne Alfred from Cairo, Egypt. "Fhedi" won 8 awards: Best Overall Film; Best Speed Film; Best International Film; Best Actor, Jeffrey Peter; Best Supporting Actor, Mina Louis; Best Original Score, Samuel Maher; Best Screenplay and Best Director for Anne Alfred. Nine-year-old Jeffrey Peter played the lead role, Fhedi, which means savior.

2017 
"Best Speed Film" was Brother by Chris Hussar. "Best International Film" was The Gift by Andrew Matthews. "Best KidVid" went to Rachel Lowry for Lost, which qualified her team to pitch for and win the 8168 Feature Production Prize, which in 2021 has reached theaters and distribution as Final Frequency.

2016 
The 2016 "Best Film" prize was awarded to The Paperclip, starring James Sayess who received a nomination for best actor.

2013 
The 2013 "Best Film" prize was awarded to ReMoved, a film based on the 2013 festival's assigned theme of "atonement".

2012 
In 2012 "Best Film" was given to "Refuge", produced by Paul e Luebbers and Joel VanderSpek.
The "Best International Film" award presented to "Ghosts of Europe" produced by Jesse Hutch and Jamie Rauch.

2011 
The film "Useless", produced by Dennis & Olivia Bentivengo, was awarded "Best Film".  "Best Director" to Owen Kingston, Tom Cooper for "Child’s Play".

2010 
"Best Film" award presented to Helen Urriola for her production "The Party".

2009 
Repeat winner Wes Llewellyn honored with "Best Film" for "UP IN THE AIR".

2008 
The "Best Film" award presented to "Stained", produced by Joshua Weigel, Aaron Moore and Jeff Bartsch.
"Best International Film" went to "Coppelius, Matthias Haag and Travis Mendel, Producers.

2007 
2007 "Best Film" awarded to "A GOOD DAY" Produced and Directed by Amanda Llewellyn & Wes Llewellyn

2006 
The 2006 "Best Film" prize was awarded to "Cinqui Minuti" (5 Minutes) from Milan Italy.  The screenplay was written by co-director Sergio Mascheroni.  The film was produced and directed by Deborah E. Brown with CinemaVerita.com of Padova Italy.  "5 Minuti" was based on theme "Faith and Fear" from the assigned Bible reference Hebrews 11:6.  The film was also awarded as the 2006 "Best Foreign Film", "Best Screenplay" given to Mascheroni, and "Best Scriptural Integration".  Italian actress Barbara Sanua was nominated for "Best Actress" and Maurizio Desinan was nominated for "Best Actor".  Barbara Sanua participated in four 168 Film Project productions, passing away in Nov. 2013 from Cystic Fibrosis just months after her final 168 Film Project entry.  "5 Minuti" has been translated and distributed in 16 languages worldwide, and was heralded as "The New Jesus Film" by 168 Project founder John Ware.

"Best Actress" for 2006 was presented to Marieke Douridas for her portrayal in "Free of Charge"; Douridas died in April 2006.

2005 
Best Short Film" awarded to "A Temp for All Seasons" produced by Michael Toay.  Josh Greene was awarded "Best Screenplay" for "The Commission".

2004 
The 2004 "Best Film" award given to producers Jim O'Keeffe, Dawn O'Keeffe & Talin Parseghian for "Max".  Luke Schelhaas was awarded "Best Screenplay" for "Max".

2003 
Producers Wes and Amanda Llewllyn's film "Crosswalk" was awarded "Best Short Film", "Best Story", "Best Scriptural Integration", "Best Editor", "Best Cinematographer".

References

External links 
 
https://filmfreeway.com/168FilmProject

Film festivals in California
Christian film festivals